CMQ was a Cuban radio and television station located in Havana, Cuba, reaching an audience in the 1940s and 1950s, attracting viewers and listeners with a program that ranged from music and news dissemination. It later expanded into radio and television networks. As a radio network it was a heated competitor of the RHC-Cadena Azul network.

Founding
The company was founded on March 12, 1933, by Miguel Gabriel and Ángel Cambó. Ten years later, on August 1, 1943, half of it was acquired by the business group of Goar Mestre. In the beginning, it transmitted only in the capital expanding later to the rest of the country.

Pre-revolutionary Cuba was an early adopter of new technology, including TV. Cuba was the first Latin American country to have television. In December 1946, station CM-21P conducted an experimental multi-point live broadcast.

Regular commercial broadcasting began in October 1950 with Gaspar Pumarejo's Unión Radio TV. This was followed by Goar Mestre Espinosa's CMQ-TV on channel 6 on December 18, 1950. CMQ officially launched on March 11, 1951, and would become an NBC affiliate. By 1954, CMQ-TV had expanded into a seven-station network. With the CMQ network, Cuba the second country in the world, only after the United States, to have a national TV network.

At the beginning of the 1950s with the transmission of the novel El Derecho de Nacer, by Felix B. Caignet, displaced the competing station, RHC Cadena Azul. It is with this leadership that the second Cuban television channel, CMQ TV, Channel 6 is born. It was initially located on Calle Monte, on the corner of Paseo del Prado. On March 12, 1948 the radio studio was moved to the Radiocentro building in La Rampa and Calle L in El Vedado.

Timeline
Source: Encyclopedia of Television, Volume 1, Horace Newcomb, p.636
 1952: Video network linking the provincial capitals established
 1952: regular use of the kinescope
 1954: CMQ-TV transmits the World Series between the U.S. and Cuba using an airplane as a relay
 1957: direct transmission of regular, live signal between the U.S. and Cuba, using the "Over the Horizon" system

References

Television in Cuba
Radio in Cuba
Television channels and stations established in 1950
Radio stations in Cuba
1933 establishments in Cuba
1959 disestablishments in Cuba 
Television channels and stations disestablished in 1959
Radio_stations_disestablished_in_1959
Radio stations established in 1933